Ninxa is a youth funded private organization in Bahrain founded to cater and promote the majority needs of Japanese animation (anime), Japanese graphic novels (manga), related gaming, as well as Japanese and Western pop-culture (music, cinema, television) fans in the Kingdom of Bahrain and the surrounding region. Ninxa holds events annually during a Friday.

NINXA made efforts since 2007 to organize events/gatherings and continue giving more in the ‘otaku’ scene and has received encouragement from several official bodies among them the Japanese Embassy, American Embassy delegates, and plaudit by over 25,000 fans. The name "Ninxa" is a word found in the fictional High QuRab language and also related to the Arch Lords novel where a planet is called Ninax. The first event was held in 2011 by the end of June.

History
The sole purpose was to build gathering for fans of the same interests that are anime, manga, video games, cosplay, and generally pop-culture. Earlier, organized solely by Ahmed Alkooheji, brand name Ninxa bared the representation of a beacon of pop-culture interest within the kingdom and its surrounding countries.

Otaku Drive
NINXA follow a combination of visions and missions that it calls Otaku Drive:

Events
NINXA develops and manages various projects and properties that are used to accomplish the mission and vision of the organization.

BANICON

Bahrain Anime Convention, or BANICON for short.
It was organized under the patronage of "Hind 0.2" and whiteness the presence of speakers, participants and delegates from the GCC and partly the world. The event's program held: Gaming Realm, Cosplaying, Artists Alley, Screening Theater, History, Contests, Trivia Show, and Merchants from Saudi Arabia, Dubai, Qatar and Bahrain.

The First Summoning
The First Summoning, by Ninxa Otaku, was a brand new anime pop-culture hybrid event that compacted to a ‘summoning’. The gathering attracted anime, manga, and gaming fans within the Persian Gulf region. A first in gathering all event organisers, online related establishments, and merchants under one roof. The event was a great success and over 95% of acceptance rate and demand for more. The event combined the previous associates into one gathering.

AFK
The AFK Phenomena, a new title for a new brand of events. The Event attracted many fans from around the Persian Gulf region, the foreign residents (US, Europe), and a variety of press from Saudi Arabia, Kuwait, UAE. Purposing having the event before the starting of school semester had an impact in attendance and enjoyment of various activities such as dedicating 45% of the hall for PS3/PC Tournaments. A flooded market of merchants, screening of movies, cosplay competition, AMV competition, and other demanded activities.

SaikoroWars
‘Saikoro’, Dice in Japanese and ‘Wars’ was the event's brand for its introduction of tabletop and board games in the region.

The main aim of the event was to have the fans busy all day long with the variety of activities, games, and contests that was collectively gathered on one condition, the enjoyment of the fans. "Whether you’re a fan of Anime, wearing Costumes, playing Arcades, or Tabletop games; we got you covered. Our Anime and Cosplay fans are going to face various activities to fulfil their time, and might not want to leave! We scratched the gaming zone and instead installed the addicting competitive Arcade games. This Year we intend to highly focus on Tabletop and Board games, up to 20 different games for your enjoyment and another major 40+ players board game ‘Wolverine".

References

External links
 NINXA official website

Bahraini companies established in 2007
Event management companies of Bahrain
Japanese popular culture